CSM Digi Oradea (Official name: Clubul Sportiv Municipal Digi Oradea) is a Romanian water polo club from Oradea in Bihor County. Currently it plays in Romanian Superliga, LEN Champions League and LEN Euro Cup

Titles
 Romanian Superliga
  Winners (9): 2007, 2008, 2009, 2010, 2011, 2012, 2013, 2014, 2015
  Runners-up (4): 2016, 2017, 2018, 2019
 Romanian Cup
  Winners (3): 2012, 2013, 2016
  Runners-up (3): 2017, 2018, 2019

Current team

 Tic Marius
 Tiberiu Negrean
 Nichita Ilisie
 Luncan Darian
 Mateja Asanović
 Alex Popoviciu
 Vlad Dragomirescu
 Mihnea Gheorghe
 Colodrovschi Silvian
 Levente Vancsik
 Czenk Ferenc
 Raul Gavris
 Bogdan Remeş
 István Szabó
 Marinescu Andrei
 Soponar Ianis
 Szilagyi Marcu

Famous players
 Kálmán Kádár
 Gheorghe Dunca

Famous coaches
 Kalman Kadar
 Gheorghe Dunca
 Dorin Costrăş
 Cornel Gordan
 Ioan Alexandrescu

External links 
 

LEN Euroleague clubs
Water polo clubs in Romania
Sport in Oradea